The 2014 Men's Junior South American Volleyball Championship was the 22nd edition of the tournament, organised by South America's governing volleyball body, the Confederación Sudamericana de Voleibol (CSV). 
The tournament will feature eight teams and takes place from 27 to 31 August, in Saquarema, Brazil. The top three teams will qualify for the 2015 Junior World Championship.

Competing nations

First round

Pool A

|}

|}

Pool B

|}

|}

Final round

5th to 8th places bracket

Championship bracket

Classification 5th at 8th 

|}

Semifinals 

|}

7th place 

|}

5th place 

|}

3rd place 

|}

Final 

|}

Final standing

All-Star Team

Most Valuable Player

Best Setter

Best Opposite

Best Outside Hitters

 

Best Middle Blockers

Best Libero

External links
CSV official website

Men's South American Volleyball Championships
S
Volleyball
V